There are over 20,000 Grade II* listed buildings in England.  This page is a list of these buildings in the county of Durham, sub-divided by unitary authority.

County Durham

|}

Darlington

|}

Hartlepool

|}

Stockton-on-Tees
The Borough crosses county Durham and North Yorkshire, Stockton-on-Tees town is in county Durham therefore buildings are listed here:

|}

Notes

See also
Grade I listed buildings in County Durham
 :Category:Grade II* listed buildings in County Durham

References 
 National Heritage List for England
 Keys To The Past Durham/Northumbria councils site

External links

 
Durham
Lists of listed buildings in County Durham